Hayat Ahmad Khan (1921 – 6 February 2005) was a connoisseur and sponsor of classical music in Pakistan. He founded the All Pakistan Music Conference (APMC) in 1959 and was its secretary-general for a long time.

Early life and education
Hayat Ahmad Khan was born in Lahore, British India in 1921. He received his basic education and then graduated from the Islamia College, Lahore,  
University of Punjab. He later studied classical music at the Gandharva Mahavidyalaya, New Delhi Academy of classical music. He completed his master's degree in music there.

Establishment of Pakistan Music Conference
After the independence of Pakistan in 1947, there was definitely a need for a formal organization on a national level to encourage the classical musicians/vocalists living in obscurity and feeling neglected. Pakistan's eminent classical singer Roshan Ara Begum was reportedly threatening to give up her Riyaz (music practice) of classical music due to lack of interested listeners in Pakistan.

So Hayat Ahmad Khan, along with several other music connoisseurs, laid the foundation of All Pakistan Music Conference back in 1959. APMC started holding a six-day music festival starting in 1960 where classical, semi-classical, folk and light music events (including ghazal evenings) were held to promote the cause of music in Pakistan.

Pakistan's Dawn (newspaper) comments in 2014, "The event has a huge contribution towards introducing new talent to music fanciers of the country and revitalizing classical and semi-classical music through seasoned musicians and singers." This music festival has been held in Pakistan for more than last five decades now. "Ever since its inception, it has been a constant source of inspiration for thousands of music lovers nationwide."

Awards and recognition
 Sitara-e-Imtiaz (Star of Excellence) Award by the Government of Pakistan in 2000 for his contribution towards classical music
 Member of the National Commission on History and Culture since 1994
 President of the Japan Karate Association of Pakistan since 1970
 President of the ''Pakistan Japan Cultural Association in 1981

Death
Hayat Ahmad Khan was hospitalized on 1 February 2005 and later died on 6 February 2005 at age 83 at Lahore, Pakistan.

References

1921 births
2005 deaths
Pakistani music people
Pakistani music educators
Pakistani musicologists
Recipients of Sitara-i-Imtiaz
20th-century musicologists